Pseudapina is a genus of moths belonging to the family Tortricidae.

Species
Pseudapina lanceovalva Brown, 2003

Etymology
The genus name is a contraction of Greek pseudos (meaning false) and Anopina a genus with which the genus is superficially similar.

See also
List of Tortricidae genera

References

 , 2003: Three new genera, two new species, and some rectifications in neotropical Euliini (Lepidoptera: Tortricidae). Proceedings of the Entomological Society of Washington 105: 630-640

External links
tortricidae.com

Euliini
Tortricidae genera